The River Schooners is a 1968 Canadian documentary, produced by the National Film Board of Canada and directed by Pierre Perrault. The third and final film in his "Île-aux-Coudres Trilogy" after Pour la suite du monde and The Times That Are (Le règne du jour), the film portrays workers in L'Isle-aux-Coudres, Quebec, who are employed in the traditional but fading art of building wooden schooners.

The film was released theatrically in 1968. In 1972, it was screened at the Museum of Modern Art in New York City, as part of the New Cinema from Quebec program of 11 theatrical films from the province made between 1968 and 1971.

It was later screened at the 1984 Festival of Festivals as part of Front & Centre, a special retrospective program of artistically and culturally significant films from throughout the history of Canadian cinema.

The three films in the trilogy were released as a DVD box set in 2007.

References

External links

1968 films
National Film Board of Canada documentaries
Films shot in Quebec
Films directed by Pierre Perrault
French-language Canadian films
Canadian black-and-white films
1960s Canadian films